Mickey Mouse is an American animated comedy television series produced by Disney Television Animation for Disney Channel. It premiered on June 28, 2013, and concluded on July 20, 2019.

Series overview

Episodes

Season 1 (2013–14)

Season 2 (2014–15)

Season 3 (2015–16)

Season 4 (2017–18)

Season 5 (2018–19)

Specials (2016–17)

References

Lists of American children's animated television series episodes